"Atlanta Blue" is a song written by Don Reid, and recorded by American country music group The Statler Brothers.  It was released in March 1984 as the first single and title track from their album Atlanta Blue.  The song peaked at number 3 on the Billboard Hot Country Singles chart.

Charts

Weekly charts

Year-end charts

References

1984 singles
The Statler Brothers songs
Mercury Nashville singles
Song recordings produced by Jerry Kennedy
Songs written by Don Reid (singer)
Songs about Georgia (U.S. state)
1984 songs